Yelena Aleksandrovna Yampolskaya (born June 20, 1971, Moscow, USSR) is a Russian politician, journalist, writer and theater critic. She is a member of the State Duma of the Federal Assembly of the Russian Federation of the VII and VIII convocations since 2016. Yampolskaya is the Chair of the Committee for Culture of the State Duma of the Federal Assembly of the Russian Federation since July 25, 2018. She served as Chief editor of the newspaper Culture (2011-2019).

References

External links

 

1971 births
Living people
Politicians from Moscow
United Russia politicians
21st-century Russian politicians
Seventh convocation members of the State Duma (Russian Federation)
Eighth convocation members of the State Duma (Russian Federation)
21st-century Russian women politicians
Russian Academy of Theatre Arts alumni
Russian women journalists
Russian theatre critics
Russian women critics
Writers from Moscow
21st-century Russian women writers